General Jacobson or Jacobsen may refer to:

Arnold W. Jacobsen (1892–1970), U.S. Marine Corps major general
Carsten Jacobson (born 1955), German Army lieutenant general
James A. Jacobson (fl. 1990s–2020s), U.S. Air Force lieutenant general
Kevin J. Jacobsen (born 1958), U.S. Air Force brigadier general